Dream 17 was a mixed martial arts event held by Fighting and Entertainment Group's mixed martial arts promotion Dream. The event took place on September 24, 2011 at the Saitama Super Arena in Saitama, Japan.

Background
Contrary to previous events, Dream used the card to launch a new rule change: the use of three, five-minute rounds.

This event featured the opening round in Dream's World Bantamweight Grand Prix.

Results

World Bantamweight Grand Prix 2011 Bracket

References

2011 in mixed martial arts
Dream (mixed martial arts) events
Sport in Saitama (city)
Mixed martial arts in Japan
2011 in Japanese sport